John Maxwell Erskine, 1st Baron Erskine of Rerrick,  (14 December 1893 – 14 December 1980) was a Scottish banker. He acted as Governor of Northern Ireland from 1964 to 1968.

Life

Lord Erskine was born in Kirkcudbright, the son of John and Maryanne Erskine, and was educated at Kirkcudbright Academy.

He was General Manager of the Commercial Bank of Scotland from 1932 to 1953, and a director from 1951 to 1969. From 1937 to 1940 he was President of the Institute of Bankers in Scotland. In 1933 he was elected a Fellow of the Royal Society of Scotland. His proposers were James Watt, Robert Grant, Sir Thomas Barnby Whitson, and Ralph Allan Sampson.

He was knighted in 1949, created a baronet in 1961 and created a Baron in 1964.

Family

He married Henrietta Dunnett in 1922 and they had one son and one daughter. His son Iain Maxwell Erskine succeeded him as 2nd Baron Erskine of Rerrick.

Sources
The International Who's Who, 1980–81

External links
Portrait of Lord Erskine of Rerrick – Art UK website

References

1893 births
1980 deaths
Alumni of the University of Edinburgh
Knights Grand Cross of the Order of the British Empire
Knights of Justice of the Order of St John
Fellows of the Royal Society of Edinburgh
People from Kirkcudbright
John
Hereditary barons created by Elizabeth II